In ancient Greek religion and Greek mythology, Minthe (also Menthe, Mintha or Mentha;  or  or ) is an Underworld Naiad nymph associated with the river Cocytus. She was beloved by Hades, the King of the Underworld, and became his mistress, but she was transformed into a mint plant by either his wife Persephone or his sister and mother-in-law Demeter. The plant was also called by some as Hedyosmos (ἡδύοσμος), which means "sweet-smelling".

Etymology 
The ancient Greek noun  or  translates to 'mint'. According to R. S. P. Beekes, it is of undoubtedly pre-Greek origin due to the variant ending in "-ᾰ". The -nth-/-nthos- element in menthe has been described as a characteristic of a class of words borrowed from a Pre-Greek language: compare akanthos, labyrinthos, Korinthos, and hyakinthos.

Mythology 

The Naiad nymph Minthe, daughter of the infernal river-god Cocytus, became concubine to Hades, the lord of the Underworld and god of the dead. In jealousy, his wife Persephone intervened and metamorphosed Minthe, in the words of Strabo's account, "into the garden mint, which some call hedyosmos (lit. 'sweet-smelling')". A mountain near Pylos was named after Minthe, where one of the few temples of Hades in Greece was situated:

Near Pylus, towards the east, is a mountain named after Minthe, who, according to myth, became the concubine of Hades, was trampled under foot by Core, and was transformed into garden-mint, the plant which some call Hedyosmos. Furthermore, near the mountain is a precinct sacred to Hades,

Similarly to that, a scholiast on Nicander wrote that Minthe became Hades' mistress; for this Persephone tore her into pieces, but Hades turned his dead lover into the fragrant plant that bore her name in her memory. Ovid also briefly mentions Minthe and her transformation at the hands of Persephone in his Metamorphoses, but neglects to mention the story behind it. According to Oppian, Minthe had been Hades' mistress before he abducted and married Persephone, but he set her aside once he carried off and married his queen. Afterwards, she would boast that she surpassed Persephone in beauty and that Hades would soon return to her; in anger over the nymph's insolence, Persephone's mother Demeter trampled her, and thus from the earth sprang the mint herb:

Mint, men say, was once a maid beneath the earth, a Nymph of Cocytus, and she lay in the bed of Aidoneus; but when he raped the maid Persephone from the Aetnaean hill, then she complained loudly with overweening words and raved foolishly for jealousy, and Demeter in anger trampled her with her feet and destroyed her. For she had said that she was nobler of form and more excellent in beauty than dark-eyed Persephone and she boasted that Aidoneus would return to her and banish the other from his halls: such infatuation leapt upon her tongue. And from the earth sprang the weak herb that bears her name.

Bell notes that Demeter went through too much pain following Persephone's abduction and partial return to tolerate any adulterous behaviour against her daughter. Oppian writing that she was trampled to death is perhaps an allusion to the verb , minytho, meaning "to reduce." Orpheus wrote that Demeter, seeing the mint sad, hated it, and made it barren.

According to Julius Pollux's Onomasticon, Minthe was mentioned by Cratinus in his lost Nomoi.

Culture 
In ancient Greece, mint was used in funerary rites, together with rosemary and myrtle, and not simply to offset the smell of decay; mint was an element in the fermented barley drink called the kykeon that was an essential preparatory entheogen for participants in the Eleusinian Mysteries, which offered hope in the afterlife for initiates. Minthe might have originated from Demeter's mystery cults, alongside figures like Baubo and the daughters of Celeus.

The mint was highly valued due to its aromatic properties and its capacity as a condiment that brings out the flavour of many foods. It was regarded as an aphrodisiac, hence Minthe's role in becoming the lover of Hades; at the same time it was used as a contraceptive method, as it was believed that consuming it before the act would prevent a pregnancy. Thus the mint, a plant of sterility, was seen as the opponent of Demeter, the goddess of fertility. In the same vein, the relation of Minthe and Hades is a barren one, since no children are produced from the couple, which is also true for Hades and Persephone themselves. The pomegranate fruit, central to the myth of Hades and Persephone, was also both a fertility symbol and a birth control method just like the mint.

See also 

 Zeus and Hera
 Psalacantha
 Leuce
 Adonis
 Niobe
 Leucothoe

References

Bibliography 

 
 
 
 
 
 
 
 
 
 
 
 
  Online version at Perseus.tufts project.
 
 
  Online version at the Perseus Digital Library.
 
  Online version at the Perseus.tufts library.

External links 
 MINTHE from The Theoi Project
 

Naiads
Metamorphoses into flowers in Greek mythology
Deeds of Demeter
Chthonic beings
Children of Potamoi
Women of Hades
Greek underworld
Nymphs
Persephone
Eleusinian Mysteries
Metamorphoses characters
Mentha